Vardell Family Cottages Historic District are three historic summer homes and national historic district located at Blowing Rock, Watauga County, North Carolina.  They are Opicherhoka (1899-1900), Hemlock Cottage (c. 1903, 1950s), and The Shoe (1933). Opicherhoka is a picturesque two-story, weatherboarded frame Arts and Crafts-style dwelling.  Hemlock Cottage is a small rectangular, plainly-finished, weatherboarded, frame cottage.  It consists of a two-story, two-room main block, a one-story shed roof front porch, and a gable roof ell.  The Shoe is a small rectangular Arts and Crafts style one-story-with-loft frame cottage.

It was listed on the National Register of Historic Places in 2001.

References

Houses on the National Register of Historic Places in North Carolina
Historic districts on the National Register of Historic Places in North Carolina
Houses in Watauga County, North Carolina
National Register of Historic Places in Watauga County, North Carolina